The Lieutenant River is a  tidal river located in Old Lyme, Connecticut.  It joins the Connecticut River in the estuary, just above the point where that river flows into Long Island Sound.

The river has a public boat launch and is a popular fishing spot.

The Lieutenant River is popular among artists and photographers.  A number of American impressionist artists, including Childe Hassam, painted views of the river while staying at the Florence Griswold House in Old Lyme.

The Florence Griswold Museum was designed with windows that have  sweeping views of the Lieutenant River.

See also
List of rivers of Connecticut

References

Old Lyme, Connecticut
Rivers of New London County, Connecticut
Tributaries of the Connecticut River
Rivers of Connecticut